Birgitte Elise Esmark (13 October 1841 – 2 April 1897) was a Norwegian malacologist and the first woman to receive a scholarship from the University of Kristiania (Oslo) in 1879, five years ahead of the opening of the university to women.

Esmark was born in Brevik to mineralogist Morten Thrane Esmark (1801–1882) and Ulrike Benedicte Wiborg (1810–1898). Her grandfather Jens Esmark was also a mineralogist who had married the daughter of zoologist Morten Thrane Brünnich. While in Madeira, then a sanatarium, to convalesce from tuberculosis, she collected molluscs and insects that she donated to the museum. She then received a scholarship to collect in Nordland and Finnmark from the Royal Frederik's University where her uncle Laurits Martin Esmark served as professor of zoology. In 1884 she published a dissertation on the land and freshwater molluscs of Norway. 

She was also involved in charity and worked for the poor in Kristiania and with Ida Wedel Jarlsberg she set up an institution for the education of women on Sundays. They also began a Young Women's Christian Society in 1894.

References 

1841 births
1897 deaths
Norwegian malacologists